The places where social nudity is practised for recreation in Asia include nude beaches (also known as clothing-optional beaches or free beaches) and some naturist resorts.

Indonesia
Bali au Naturel (Singaraja)
Laki Uma Villa (Denpasar)

Israel
Locations in the Palestinian territories that are under effective Israeli administration (Area C) are included in this section.

Central District

Ga'ash (גַּעַשׁ) Beach (22 km north of Tel Aviv by road) located just west of Kibbutz Yakum (יָקוּם‎) has a clothing-optional section. It can be busy at times but the long stretch of beach offers space for everyone. The northernmost part is popular with the LGBT community.
Shefayim (שְׁפָיִים) Nude Beach (19 km north of Tel Aviv by road) is a small nudist beach visited by those who prefer its tranquility.

Tel Aviv District

Apollonia Beach (15 km north of Tel Aviv by road) is located immediately west of Apollonia National Park. The narrow strip of secluded beach under the fortress ruins is frequented by nudists.
Tel Aviv Naked Swim is a semi-secretive annual event normally published on a private unsearchable Facebook group.

Southern District

The end of Lighthouse Beach (10 km southwest of Eilat by road) close to Princess Hotel is frequently visited by nude bathers. It is a great location for snorkelling above the tropical coral reefs.
Twice a year, in June and September, a mostly-young naturist festival is held in Israel, featuring a lot of parties, music, spiritual lessons, and more. This event takes place not far from Eilat on road number 40, at a place called "Desert Ashram".

Israeli-West Bank
Neve Midbar Beach at the northern end of the Dead Sea is a small private resort with a section of the shore set aside as a nude beach.
This is a natural beach and there are no facilities, but the sweet water springs can be used for shower after a dip in the Dead Sea.

Japan
Some public hot spring baths in Japan allow mixed gender nudity, particularly those in rural locations and where permitted by prefectural law. Related Japanese terms include: onsen for hot spring; konyoku for mixed gender bath; and sentō for a type of public bath, but gender separated.

Philippines
China Sea Island in Boayan Island, Philippines
Fridays Island in El Nido, Palawan, Philippines

India
Public nudity is disallowed for adults.

Sri Lanka
Public nudity anywhere or topless sunbathing is not allowed in Sri Lanka.

Thailand
In Thailand there are a number of naturist resorts which are member resorts of the Naturist Association Thailand

Chan Resort in Pattaya, 
Oriental Village (closed) Chiang Mai, 
Phuan Naturist Village  (closed) outside of Sattahip, 
Lemon Tree Resort  (closed)  in Phuket
Barefeet in Bangkok
NF Camp  (closed)  in Phetchaburi
Oriental Beach Village on the island of Koh Kho Khao. 
Peace Blue Naiharn in Phuket has been completed and is open, and additional naturist resorts are under construction. 
Dragonfly Naturist Village outside of Pattaya is a participating business of the American Association for Nude Recreation.

Some previously textile resorts are also becoming naturist resorts. 
Harmony Resort Rawai and Oasis Naturist Villa in Phuket and Barefeet Heaven Hill Naturist Resort in Trang were both textile resorts until recently.

References

Asia
Asia
Lists of places
Asia-related lists